The Starners Dam Bridge is a steel stringer bridge over Alloway Creek on Baptist Road in Taneytown, Carroll County, Maryland, USA. It is also called Alloway Creek Bridge.

History 
The steel stringer bridge was constructed in 1911 with construction number 200000CL0207010 about 0.11 miles north of Starners Dam in Taneytown. Its deck was made by concrete cast-in-place and it has two lanes of roadway which are part of Baptist Road. Its purpose is to carry Baptist Road over Alloway Creek. 

It was reconstructed in 1987 and is now owned by the County Highway Agency. In 2008, it had an average daily traffic of 232 vehicles with 5% of truck traffic and it is toll free. It is inspected for flaws every 24 months.

References

Road bridges in Maryland
Steel bridges in the United States
Bridges completed in 1911